SKIDATA GmbH is an Austrian company which has installed more than 10,000 access systems for people and vehicles in: ski resorts, shopping centers, major airports, cities, sport stadiums, fairs and amusement parks.

Segments

Skidata provides entry gates for:
Parking Management
Mountain Destination
Fairs, Attractions & Arenas

within different business areas (Airports, Office Parking, Residential Parking, Public Transport, Mountain Destinations, Tourist Destinations, Stadiums, Arenas, Theme & Amusement Parks, Trade fairs & Exhibitions).

History 
In 1977, Günther Walcher developed the first electronically printed tickets and cash registers, and thus replaced the handwritten ski passes previously used. To market and further develop these innovations, SKIDATA was founded in Grödig bei Salzburg. In 1979, the first cash register was implemented that used an electromagnetic stamp unit to print tickets. The System 320 was released in 1981; it consisted of a register computer and an automated output device.

1979: The System 320 was brought to market. It consisted of a register computer, an automated output device and an access reader. The access system supported seamless billing and connected larger ski regions.

At the end of the 1980s, SKIDATA released the first access systems with hands-free technology. SKIDATA developed the first hands-free ski ticket – the Keycard. SKIDATA utilizes "hands-free" technology, also known as RFID technology. SKIDATA expanded its business from ski destinations to parking management.

In 1989, SKIDATA was the first provider of machines that allow drivers to enter the facilities and pay by credit card directly at the entry to the parking lot.

In 1991 the Düsseldorf Airport was equipped.

In 1992 the company equipped its first international airport, Munich Airport, with a parking management system.

In 1995, the company partnered with the Swiss company Swatch to develop watches that also provide access authorization.

In 1997, French chip card maker Gemplus becomes majority shareholder of SKIDATA.

2001: Takeover by the Swiss Kudelski Group in 2001 opens new markets.

In 2007, SKIDATA started its operation in India with a local partner and formed a partnership business. In the year 2009, SKIDATA decided to form a joint venture called SKIDATA (India) Pvt Ltd. SKIDATA invested in 49% equity stake and Hinditron invested in 51% equity stake. During this period SKIDATA (India) Pvt Ltd has held the most privileged car access references in India across a variety of market segments. Customers include: GMR Hyderabad International Airport, Bangalore International Airport, Mumbai Chhatrapati Shivaji International Airport, Inorbit Mall (Malad & Vashi), Oberoi Mall, DLF (Emporio, Saket, Vasant Kunj), Ansals, Express Avenue, Growel 101, Prestige Group, Brigade Group. SKIDATA (India) Pvt Ltd has also secured esteem reference like 10 Board of Control for Cricket in India (BCCI) cricket stadiums at Kolkata, Delhi, Chennai, Mumbai, Ahmedabad, Bangalore, Ranchi, Pune, Mohali and Hyderabad and one formula one stadium at Buddh International Circuit.

In 2010, SKIDATA fully equipped Dallas/Fort Worth International Airport as a parking client.

In 2014 SKIDATA set up subsidiaries in Brazil, India, Uruguay, Malaysia and Turkey.

In March 2015, Palace of Auburn Hills announced to introduce a loyalty program based on a platform from SKIDATA.

On April 7, 2015 SKIDATA installed its 7,000 Parking.Logic systems in 's-Hertogenbosch, Netherlands.

In 2015, SKIDATA opened its office in Tunis.

In 2016, SKIDATA installed a vehicle access management system and a people access system for the Otkrytiye Arena in Moscow, which includes 42,000 seats in the stadium and 3,000 parking spaces in the parking areas.

In March 2016, the access system of Familyparks has been optimized by SKIDATA.

In April 2016, during the Intertraffic exhibition in Amsterdam, the city of Amsterdam signed a contract which will see SKIDATA equip 25 parking areas in the city that account for 25,000 parking spaces.

Loyalty.Logic has been developed by SKIDATA for the winter sports industry.

SKIDATA and partners provide Minnesota Vikings Fans a new Vikings App, which includes a digital ticketing option, roue finding, food and beverage ordering, merchandise ordering, push notifications and video content.

In May 2016, SKIDATA installed the new electronical parking management system at Salzburg Airport. The system manages 3,200 parking spaces of the airport.

Records
On November 25, 2014 SKIDATA set a new speed record for how many people can pass through an access control system in a single hour. This event took place in Grödig, Austria. The exact number was 2,033, which means that a stadium for 60,000 fans could be filled in less than an hour.

References

Technology companies of Austria
Electronics companies established in 1977
Austrian brands
Business services companies established in 1977
Austrian companies established in 1977
Economy of Salzburg (state)